Blepephaeus is a genus of longhorn beetles of the subfamily Lamiinae, containing the following species:

 Blepephaeus agenor (Newman, 1842)
 Blepephaeus andamanicus Breuning, 1935
 Blepephaeus annulatus Breuning, 1936
 Blepephaeus arrowi Breuning, 1935
 Blepephaeus bangalorensis Breuning, 1957
 Blepephaeus banksi Breuning, 1936
 Blepephaeus bipunctatus Breuning & de Jong, 1941
 Blepephaeus blairi Breuning, 1935
 Blepephaeus borneensis Breuning, 1944
 Blepephaeus fulvus (Pic, 1933)
 Blepephaeus grisescens Hüdepohl, 1998
 Blepephaeus hiekei Breuning, 1974
 Blepephaeus higaononi Vives, 2009
 Blepephaeus indicus Breuning, 1935
 Blepephaeus infelix (Pascoe, 1856)
 Blepephaeus irregularis (Heller, 1915)
 Blepephaeus itzingeri Breuning, 1935
 Blepephaeus laosicus Breuning, 1947
 Blepephaeus lemoulti (Breuning, 1938)
 Blepephaeus leucosticticus Breuning, 1938
 Blepephaeus lignosus Breuning, 1950
 Blepephaeus luteofasciatus (Gressitt, 1941)
 Blepephaeus malaccensis Breuning, 1935
 Blepephaeus marmoratus Heller, 1934
 Blepephaeus marshalli Breuning, 1935
 Blepephaeus mausoni (Breuning, 1947)
 Blepephaeus mindanaonis (Schultze, 1920)
 Blepephaeus modicus (Gahan, 1888)
 Blepephaeus multinotatus (Pic, 1925)
 Blepephaeus nepalensis (Hayashi, 1981)
 Blepephaeus niasicus Breuning, 1950
 Blepephaeus nicobaricus Breuning, 1935
 Blepephaeus nigrofasciatus Pu, 1999
 Blepephaeus nigrosparsus Pic, 1925
 Blepephaeus nigrostigma Wang & Jiang, 1998
 Blepephaeus ocellatus (Gahan, 1888)
 Blepephaeus puae Lin, 2011
 Blepephaeus shembaganurensis Breuning, 1979
 Blepephaeus stigmosus Gahan, 1895
 Blepephaeus strandi Breuning, 1936
 Blepephaeus subannulatus Breuning, 1979
 Blepephaeus subcruciatus (White, 1858)
 Blepephaeus succinctor (Chevrolat, 1852)
 Blepephaeus sumatrensis Breuning, 1938
 Blepephaeus undulatus (Pic, 1930)
 Blepephaeus varius (Heller, 1898)

References

 
Lamiini